Frane Vladislavić (born 9 January 1994 in Melbourne) is a Croatian football winger, currently a free agent. Vladislavić also holds an Australian passport.

Club career
A Croatian U-17 international, Vladislavić was moved in January 2012 to the Hajduk first team by coach Krasimir Balakov. Having debuted for the first team, he was sent on loan to Hajduk's feeder team NK Primorac 1929 in the summer of 2012.

References

External links
 
Frane Vladislavić profile at hajduk.hr
Frane Vladislavić profile at the Croatian Football Federation official website

1994 births
Living people
Soccer players from Melbourne
Association football wingers
Association football fullbacks
Croatian footballers
Croatia youth international footballers
HNK Hajduk Split players
NK Primorac 1929 players
NK Dugopolje players
HNK Segesta players
NK Junak Sinj players
NK Imotski players
Croatian Football League players
First Football League (Croatia) players